Biomanufacturing is a type of manufacturing or biotechnology that utilizes biological systems to produce commercially important biomaterials and biomolecules for use in medicines, food and beverage processing, and industrial applications.  Biomanufacturing products are recovered from natural sources, such as blood, or from cultures of microbes, animal cells, or plant cells grown in specialized equipment.  The cells used during the production may have been naturally occurring or derived using genetic engineering techniques.

Products
There are thousands of biomanufacturing products on the market today.  Some examples of general classes are listed below:

Medicine 
 Amino acids
 Biopharmaceuticals
 Cytokines
 Fusion proteins
 Growth factors
 Monoclonal antibodies
 Vaccines

Food and beverage 
 Amino acids
 Enzymes
 Protein supplements

Industrial applications that employ cells and/or enzymes 
 Biocementation
 Bioremediation
 Detergents
 Plastics

Unit operations
A partial listing of unit operations utilized during biomanufacturing includes the following:
 Blood plasma fractionation
 Cell culture
 Cell separation, such as filtration and centrifugation
 Fermentation
 Homogenization
 Column chromatography
 Ultrafiltration and/or diafiltration
 Clarification, such as filtration
 Formulation
 Filling vials or syringes for injectable medicines

Equipment and facilities

Equipment and facility requirements are dictated by the product(s) being manufactured. Process equipment is typically constructed of stainless steel or plastic.  Stainless steel equipment can be cleaned and reused.  Some plastic equipment is disposed of after a single use.   Products manufactured for medical or food use must be produced in facilities designed and operated according to  Good Manufacturing Practice (GMP) regulations.  Cleanrooms are often required to control the levels of particulates and microorganisms.  Sterilization and aseptic processing equipment are required for production of injectable products.

Employment
Skilled professionals are required for positions throughout the life cycle of a biomanufacturing product, which includes:
 Research
 Product development
 Process development
 Preclinical evaluation
 Clinical trials
 Engineering
 Production
 Supply Chain Management
 Validation
 Quality Control
 Quality Assurance
 Materials Management
 Sales

Details for some of these positions are listed in “The Model Employee,” published by the North Carolina Biotechnology Center. In addition, the North Carolina Association for Biomedical Research (NCABR) maintains the website About Bioscience that offers free online videos on various careers.

Education and training
Several academic institutions have developed curricula and built facilities to provide education and training in biomanufacturing to students from community colleges, universities, and/or industry.   NCBioImpact, established in 2004, is an example of a comprehensive state-wide training network.  Member institutions Golden LEAF Biomanufacturing Training and Education Center (BTEC) at North Carolina State University, (BRITE) at North Carolina Central University, and North Carolina Community College System’s BioNetwork operate multidisciplinary centers dedicated to workforce development for the biomanufacturing industry.

MiraCosta College and Solano College in California developed the first bachelor of science degree in biomanufacturing.  The degree is largely lab-based and is built on a contextualized science and statistics backbone.  The upper division classes recognize the unique environment of biological production where the process sciences and technology thrive in partnership with quality and regulatory compliance.

References

External links
 NCBioImpact
 Biomanufacturing Research Institute and Technology Enterprise (BRITE) 
 BioNetwork 
 Golden LEAF Biomanufacturing Training and Education Center (BTEC)
 North Carolina Biotechnology Center
 North Carolina Association for Biomedical Research (NCABR)
 About Bioscience

Biotechnology
Biopharmaceuticals
Food industry
Life sciences industry
Industrial processes
Pharmaceutical industry